Isla Santa Cruz may refer to:
Isla Santa Cruz (Baja California Sur)
Santa Cruz Island (Galápagos)
Santa Cruz Island in the Channel Islands